The Nobel Oil Group is a  corporate group operating primarily in the Republic of Azerbaijan, USA, UK as well as in Romania. Registered in the UK, The Group provides integrated operating services within the oil and gas sector and is also developing its exploration and production capabilities.

History and development 

Nobel Oil Ltd was originally established in 2005 by Nasib Hasanov as a technical service provider, offering services to the oil and gas industry in the Caspian region. These include wells’ work over, drilling, installation, construction, engineering and maintenance, repair and operations services.

In 2013, Nobel Oil undertook a comprehensive strategic review of its business, with a focus on assessing the company's organizational capabilities, strategic goals, operating markets and growth options both regionally and globally.

In 2014, Nobel Oil reorganised its corporate structure to place its Azerbaijan-based businesses under a parent company headquartered in the UK and align its business processes with international standards. As a result, all service segments of the oil and gas industry were united under Nobel Oil Services (UK) Limited, while the exploration & production business was separated under the name of Nobel Upstream. 
Nobel Oil Services (UK) Limited was founded on 25 June 2014 and registered in the United Kingdom. Nobel Oil Services (UK) Limited is a parent company of Global Energy Solutions LLC, Prokon LLC, Absheron Drilling LLC, Llamrei DMCC, etc.

In 2014, Nobel Oil E&P (UK) Limited was established under a Nobel Upstream trademark. Nobel Oil E&P (UK) Limited is a parent company of Nobel Oil E&P Caspian Limited, Nobel Oil E&P North Sea Limited, Nobel Oil E&P North America (UK) Limited, and Nobel Oil E&P North America LLC.

In 2016, Nobel Upstream made an investment in the UK North Sea, buying a 7.59% stake in the Maclure oil field from Shell Oil. Royal Dutch Shell sold North Sea oil field, in a transaction with UK Nobel Upstream for an undisclosed fee. Later, Nobel Upstream's CEO Jeremy Huck resigned; no farewell statement or reason was issued by the Group.

Nobel Upstream is the majority shareholder of a large acreage position in the Permian Basin (North America). With its operating partner Three Span Oil & Gas, Nobel Upstream started producing oil and gas in August 2014.

Owners and top management

Nasib Hasanov, an Azerbaijan-born businessman, is the founder and owner of Nobel Oil Services (UK) Limited and Nobel Oil E&P (UK) Limited, both registered in the UK.

Development of Umid gas field

Since 2008, the Group has been developing its exploration and production capabilities through its participation in the exploration of the Umid offshore gas-condensate field located 75 kilometres south of the Azerbaijani capital, Baku.

The Umid offshore gas-condensate field is in the water depth range 40 – 80 m. It is being explored under the agreement between SOCAR and Nobel Oil Exploration and Production Ltd. The Parties have following participating interests in the Umid project: SOCAR – 80%, Nobel Oil Exploration and Production Ltd. – 20%.

President Ilham Aliyev of Azerbaijan placed strong hopes in development of the Umid gas field, remarking in 2010, "This field has a great future." He made similar comments in 2012.

The joint venture with Nobel Oil Group has drilled three wells in the Umid gas field since 2012. One well failed, while the other two produced decreasing amounts of natural gas: in 2012 – 1,500 thousand cubic meters of gas, 2013 – 638,000 cubic meters, and in 2014 - 630,000 cubic meters of gas per day. The plan was to drill a total of six wells, producing one million to 1.5 million cubic meters of natural gas per day.

But, as of October 2014, Nobel Oil Group and its partner decided to stop all drilling due to "technical problems in the production process." They announced a new international tender for a foreign partner to lead the way and create a new strategy. As of January 2016, they have not received such a tender.

Since March 2015 Nobel Oil Group and its partner decided to drill a new appraisal well to get a better estimate of gas reserves in Umid; they hope that this drilling expense will be absorbed by the future foreign partner. The Nobel Oil Group and its partner require the new foreign partner to have not only the skills and experience of deep-water offshore drilling, but also have available cash reserves.

According to analysts, the Umid ("Hope") gas field was too technologically challenging for the two companies developing it, despite their spending some US$5 billion already by 2010. Given that this was a period of high gas prices, they projected about $45 billion in net operating income. Since 2010 expenses have increased whilst natural gas market prices have fallen.

Services

Nobel Oil has a number of services carried out by different subsidiaries of their company.

Absheron Qazma: Provides integrated drilling and well management services. Such services include well design and planning, drilling operations, casing string design, well completion, well workover and more. 
Global Energy Solutions: Provides equipment maintenance services, typically to customers in Azerbaijan's energy industry. 
Prokon: Offers project management services.
Llamrei: Offers procurement, logistics and warehouse activities. 
Nobel Oil Downstream: Nobel's retail gasoline service stations in Romania.

References

External links

Oil and gas companies of Azerbaijan
Non-renewable resource companies established in 2005
Corporate groups